The Roman Catholic Diocese of Sivagangai is located at the southeast corner of Bay of Bengal, 45 km east of Madurai city, in Tamil Nadu, India.

History 
 
It was established on July 25, 1987 bifurcated from the Archdiocese of Madurai.  The Most Rev. S. Edward Francis was the First Bishop of the new Diocese and Bp. Jebamalai Susaimanickam succeeded him as the second bishop.

The territory of the diocese includes two civil districts Ramanathapuram and Sivagangai.  The total population of the area is 2,502,340 of which the Catholic population is 177,868 (8.1%) and still growing.  20 years after the diocese has 62 parish centers, 734 mission stations about 107 diocesan clergy, 19 religious order priests and over 350 religious men and women serving at various religious and educational institutions in the diocesan region.

Saints and causes for canonisation
 St. John de Britto (1693), the patron saint of the diocese, entered the region as a Jesuit missionary from Europe and became the bedrock of faith for thousands of people. He was beheaded at Oriyur on Feb 4, 1693 by a regional king for preaching about Jesus Christ and establishing churches.
 Servant of God Fr. Louis Marie Leveil, SJ

Bishops

First bishop was Edward Francis.

Second bishop was Rev Dr Jebamalai Susaimanickam.

At present the Apostolic Administrator is Rev Dr Stephen Antony Pillai.

References 

 http://www.santhrex.com

External links 
 http://www.bibleintamil.com
 http://www.tamilchristianweb.com
 http://www.unnaithedi.com 
 http://www.loveandcaremission.org/
 http://www.manavai.com

Sivagangai
Christian organizations established in 1987
Roman Catholic dioceses and prelatures established in the 20th century
Christianity in Tamil Nadu